The 78th Training Division (Operations) ("Lightning") is a unit of the United States Army which served in World War I and World War II as the 78th Infantry Division, and currently trains and evaluates units of the United States Army Reserve for deployment.

Lineage
Constituted 5 August 1917 in the National Army as Headquarters, 78th Division
Organized 23 August 1917 at Camp Dix, New Jersey
Demobilized 9 July 1919 at Camp Dix, New Jersey
Reconstituted 24 June 1921 in the Organized Reserves as Headquarters, 78th Division
Organized in November 1921 at Newark, New Jersey
Redesignated 20 February 1942 as Division Headquarters, 78th Division
Ordered into active military service 15 August 1942 and reorganized at Camp Butner, North Carolina; concurrently redesignated as Headquarters, 78th Infantry Division
Inactivated 22 May 1946 in Germany
Activated 1 November 1946 at Newark, New Jersey
(Organized Reserves redesignated 25 March 1948 as the Organized Reserve Corps; *Redesignated 9 July 1952 as the Army Reserve)
Location changed 9 November 1955 to Kearny, New Jersey; on 6 December 1958 to Edison, New Jersey
Reorganized and redesignated 1 May 1959 as Headquarters, 78th Division (Training)
Reorganized and redesignated 1 October 1993 as Headquarters, 78th Division (Exercise)
Reorganized and redesignated 17 October 1999 as Headquarters, 78th Division (Training Support)
Reorganized and redesignated 1 October 2009 as Headquarters, 78th Training Brigade
Reorganized and redesignated 1 October 2010 as Headquarters, 78th Training Division

Honors

Campaign participation credit

Decorations

Other honors
A portion of Pine Swamp Road in Mineral County, West Virginia was named "WWII 78th Lightning Division Road" in honor of the division by the West Virginia Legislature.
A portion of Interstate 78 in Pennsylvania is also named after the 78th division.

World War I

The 78th Division of the United States Army was activated on 23 August 1917, over four months after the American entry into World War I, at Camp Dix, New Jersey. It consisted of four infantry regiments: the 309th, 310th, 311th and 312th; and three artillery Regiments: the 307th, 308th and 309th.

The division was originally allocated to New York and northern Pennsylvania in the National Army plan. Whilst the HQ of the 78th Division was activated in August, with the first draftees arriving in September, it was not fully active until early 1918. After several more months of training, the 78th was transported to France in May and June 1918.

In France, during the summer and fall of 1918, it was the "point of the wedge" of the final offensive which knocked out Germany. The 78th was in three major campaigns during World War I – Meuse-Argonne, St. Mihiel, and Lorraine. Demobilization at the end of the war took place in June 1919.

Activated: 27 August 1917.
Overseas: May 1918.
Major Operations: Meuse-Argonne, St. Mihiel.
Roll of Honor:  two Medal of Honor recipients
Casualties: Total-7,144 (KIA-1,169; WIA-5,975).
Commanders: Maj. Gen. Chase W. Kennedy (23 August 1917), Brig. Gen. John S. Mallory (28 November 1917), Brig. Gen. James T. Dean (28 December 1917), Maj. Gen. Hugh L. Scott (2 January 1918), Brig. Gen. James T. Dean (16 March 1918), Maj. Gen. James H. McRae (20 April 1918).
Inactivated: June 1919.

Order of battle

 Headquarters, 78th Division
 155th Infantry Brigade
 309th Infantry Regiment
 310th Infantry Regiment
 308th Machine Gun Battalion
 156th Infantry Brigade
 311th Infantry Regiment
 312th Infantry Regiment
 309th Machine Gun Battalion
 153rd Field Artillery Brigade
 307th Field Artillery Regiment (75 mm)
 308th Field Artillery Regiment (75 mm)
 309th Field Artillery Regiment (155 mm)
 303rd Trench Mortar Battery
 307th Machine Gun Battalion
 303rd Engineer Regiment
 303rd Field Signal Battalion
 Headquarters Troop, 78th Division
 303rd Train Headquarters and Military Police
 303rd Ammunition Train
 303rd Supply Train
 303rd Engineer Train
 303rd Sanitary Train
 309th, 310th, 311th, and 312th Ambulance Companies and Field Hospitals

Interwar period

The division was reconstituted in the Organized Reserve on 24 June 1921 and assigned to the states of Delaware and New Jersey

World War II

In World War II, the 78th Division was ordered into active military service at Camp Butner, North Carolina, on 15 August 1942. It was designated as a replacement pool division on 1 October 1942, and remained in this assignment until 1 March 1943, when the 78th Division was restored to field duty, and to its training regimen. 78th Division moved to the Carolina Maneuver Area on 15 November 1943 to test its training, and then returned to Camp Butner on 7 December 1943. The personnel then went on Christmas leave, and deployed to the Tennessee Maneuver Area on 25 January 1944, where they participated in the 5th Second Army Tennessee Maneuvers. They then moved to Camp Pickett, Virginia, where they filled their TO&E, (table of organization and equipment), then deployed to the staging area at Camp Kilmer, New Jersey, on 4 October 1944.

After two years as a training division, the 78th embarked for the European Theatre from the New York POE on 14 October 1944, whereupon they sailed for England. They arrived on 26 October 1944, and after further training crossed to France on 22 November 1944.

After landing in France, the division moved to Tongeren, Belgium, on 27 November 1944, and to Roetgen, Germany, on 7 December 1944, to prepare for combat. The 311th Infantry Regiment was attached to the US 8th Infantry Division in the Hurtgen Forest, 10 December. The 309th and 310th Infantry Regiments relieved elements of the 1st Division in the line in the vicinity of Entenpfuhl, 1–12 December. On the 13th these regiments smashed into Simmerath, Witzerath, and Bickerath and were fighting for Kesternich when Gerd von Rundstedt launched his counteroffensive in the Monschau area, on 18 December.

The 78th held the area it had taken from the Siegfried Line against German attacks throughout the winter. The Division attacked, 30 January 1945, and took Kesternich, 2 February, the town of Schmidt on the 8th, and captured intact the vital Schwammanauel Dam the next day. In the advance, the Roer River was crossed, 28 February, and the division joined the offensive of the First and Ninth Armies toward the Rhine. That river was crossed over the Ludendorff Bridge at Remagen, 8 March, by the 310th Regiment, the first troops to cross in the wake of the 9th Armored Division. That unit, attached to the 9th Armored and acting as a motorized unit had driven across Germany capturing Euskirchen, Rheinbach, and Bad Neuenahr. The 78th expanded the bridgehead, taking Honnef and cutting part of the Autobahn, 16 March. From 2 April to 8 May, the division was active in the reduction of the Ruhr Pocket and at VE-day was stationed near Marburg. In mid-November 1945 the division relieved the 82nd Airborne Division on occupation duty in Berlin. In May 1946, the 3rd Inf Regiment was moved to Berlin and on 15 June, it took over the Berlin Military District from the division.

The 78th Infantry Division was subsequently inactivated at Berlin on 16 June 1946. The division's infantry regiments were also inactivated as follows:
309th Infantry Regiment between 15 Apr – May 22, 1946, in Germany; 
310th Infantry Regiment on 15 Jun 1946, at Berlin; 
311th Infantry Regiment on 22 May 1946, in Germany. The division remained on occupation duty in Germany until it was inactivated  on 22 May 1946.

World War II order of battle

 Headquarters, 78th Infantry Division
 309th Infantry Regiment
 310th Infantry Regiment
 311th Infantry Regiment
 Headquarters and Headquarters Battery, 78th Infantry Division Artillery
307th Field Artillery Battalion (105mm)
308th Field Artillery Battalion (105mm)
309th Field Artillery Battalion (155mm)
903rd Field Artillery Battalion (105mm)
 303rd Engineer Combat Battalion
 303rd Medical Battalion
 78th Cavalry Reconnaissance Troop (Mechanized)

 Headquarters, Special Troops, 78th Infantry Division
 Headquarters Company, 78th Infantry Division
 778th Ordnance Light Maintenance Company
 78th Quartermaster Company
 78th Signal Company
 Military Police Platoon
 Band
 78th Counterintelligence Corps Detachment
Attachments
552nd Antiaircraft Artillery Battalion (AW) 20 December 1944 – after VE day
628th Tank Destroyer Battalion 19 December 1944 – 23 December 1944
709th Tank Battalion 10 December 1944 – 25 January 1945
736th Tank Battalion 25 January 1945 – 1 February 1945
774th Tank Battalion 3 February 1945 – 24 February 1945
817th Tank Destroyer Battalion 1 December 1944 – 6 December 1944
893rd Tank Destroyer Battalion 11 December 1944 – after VE day

Assignments in European Theater of Operations
9 November 1944: Ninth Army, 12th Army Group.
28 November 1944: XIX Corps
5 December 1944: V Corps, First Army, 12th Army Group.
18 December 1944: VII Corps.
20 December 1944: Attached, with the entire First Army, to the British 21st Army Group.
22 December 1944: XIX Corps, Ninth Army (attached to the British 21st Army Group), 12th Army Group.
2 February 1945: V Corps, First Army, 12th Army Group.
3 February 1945: XVIII (Abn) Corps.
12 February 1945: III Corps.
16 March 1945: VII Corps.
3 April 1945: XVIII (Abn) Corps.
19 April 1945: First Army, 12th Army Group.
22 May 1946: Deactivated

Summary
Called into federal service: 15 August 1942.
Overseas: 14 October 1944.
Campaigns: Rhineland, Ardennes-Alsace, Central Europe.
Days of combat: 125.
Distinguished Unit Citations: 4.
Commanders: Maj. Gen. Edwin P. Parker Jr. (August 1942 – November 1945), Maj. Gen. Ray W. Barker (January 1946 to inactivation).
Inactivated: 22 May 1946 in Europe.

World War II individual awards
One Medal of Honor recipient (Jonah Edward Kelley, of the 311th Infantry); ten Distinguished Service Crosses; 599 Silver Star medals; 3,909 Bronze Star medals and 5,454 Purple Hearts. 1,368 officers and enlisted men had perished.

Casualties
Total battle casualties: 8,146
Killed in action: 1,427
Wounded in action: 6,103
Missing in action: 231
Prisoner of war: 385

Post-war service
In November 1946, the 78th Infantry Division was reactivated at Newark, New Jersey, and in May 1959 it was reorganized as a Training Division.

The 78th Division was deployed to Southwest Asia 1990 and 1991 when the 920th Transportation Company (Medium, Petroleum) to support operations in Desert Storm. The 1018th Reception Battalion, the 2nd Brigade OSUT Headquarters, and the 1st and 3rd Battalion of the 310th Regiment as well as the 1st Brigade's 3rd Battalion, 309th Regiment with a composite detachment from the 78th Training Support Brigade, provided assistance in necessary training base expansion at Fort Dix. The 348th Military Police Detachment conducted protective service missions for key national leaders throughout the world during the mobilization period. In addition, many individuals from the 78th served as "fillers" in other deployed units.

In 1992, the division transformed into an exercise division under the Army's "Bold Shift" initiative. The new mission is to conduct small unit collective training (LANES) and computerized battle simulation exercises for client units in the First Army East area (a 14 state region). Like the other exercise divisions, the 1st Brigade was designated as the simulations exercise unit, conducting Battle Command and Staff Training for US Army Reserve and Army National Guard units at the battalion, brigade, command, and division levels. This training uses the simulations models used by the Regular Army in conducting WARFIGHTER exercises. The other brigades within the division (2d through 5th depending on the division) conducted field training for units at the squad, platoon, and company levels. In all units, then made up of US Army Reserve soldiers, there were detachments of Regular Army soldiers assigned to manage the day-to-day requirements and planning of exercises as part of the Congressionally mandated Ground Forces Readiness Enhancement (GFRE – popularly known as "Jeffries") program. This program was partially instituted to ensure that reserve component units would have continual training support in order to preclude some of the training and readiness problems that were discovered in the ramp-up, and eventual deployments, in support of Desert Storm.

One of five exercise divisions in the United States Army, the 78th Division Headquarters, and its 1st Brigade, were for many years headquartered at the Kilmer Reserve Center (the former Camp Kilmer) in Edison, New Jersey, with subordinate units located in New Jersey, Rhode Island, Massachusetts, Virginia, Maryland, Pennsylvania and New York.

As a result of the 2005 BRAC, the division's headquarters and its 1st Brigade were relocated to Fort Dix, New Jersey, joining the already located Division's 2d Brigade (LANES) and some 1st Brigade (BCST) subordinate elements.

In late 1999, the division was redesignated from 78th Division (Exercise) to 78th Division (Training Support) to reflect the growing change in the type of training provided by the division's units. There was also an associated change in the manning of the unit, adding National Guard personnel to the regulars and Army Reservists already assigned. This was one of the first instances of the growing multi-component organization of US Army units that deal with Reserve Component training and operations.

In 1999, the 189th Infantry Brigade was reflagged as the 4th Brigade, 78th Division (TS) and merged with the existing 4th Brigade, 78th Division (Exercise). The reorganization created a unique unit consisting of active-component, National Guard, civilian and drilling US Army reservists.

The 4th Brigade is a tenant unit on Fort Bragg with headquarters at the 78th Division (Training Support), Edison, New Jersey. The brigade's responsibility is to train, coach, teach and mentor the Reserve and Army National Guard units of North Carolina.

The 4th Brigade, 78th Division (Training Support) provides training assistance, support, and evaluation to priority Reserve Component units and all other units within capabilities. Synchronize training support within area of responsibility in order to enhance individual and unit readiness to meet directed mobilization and/or wartime requirements. On order, activate or augment mobilization assistance teams (MAT) to assist installation commanders in post-mobilization training and validation of mobilized units for deployment. On order, deploy a defense coordinating officer (DCO) and/or a defense coordinating element (DCE) to coordinate military support to civilian authorities (MSCA) during federal disaster response operations. Provide command and control of subordinate units.

1st BN (LS), 313th Regiment, 4th BDE, provides logistic support for a multi-component (AC/USAR/ARNG) training support brigade that conducts lanes training, TAM evals for priority RC client units; On order provides mobilization augmentation training and military support to civilian authorities.

Subordinate units 

As of 2017 the following units are subordinated to the 78th Training Division (Operations):

 1st Brigade
 3d Battalion, 309th Regiment
 2d Battalion, 311th Regiment
 3d Battalion, 318th Regiment
 2d Battalion, 323d Regiment

Insignia
The shoulder sleeve insignia was originally approved for the 78th Infantry Division on 27 May 1922. It was retained for the 78th Division (Training) on 11 Sep 1959. The insignia was redesignated on 1 Oct 1993 for the 78th Division (Exercise) and the description revised to provide metric measurements. The insignia was redesignated for the 78th Division (Training Support) on 17 Oct 1999.

Distinctive unit insignia
Description: A gold color metal and enamel device 1 3/16 inches (3.02 cm) in height overall, consisting of a white enamel alerion on a scarlet enamel disc centered upon a blue enamel equilateral triangle with notched sides, all in front of two white enamel lightning flashes in a V form contained at top and bottom by a continuous scarlet scroll inscribed below with the word "AUDACITER" in gold.
Symbolism: The white alerion on scarlet is from the arms of Lorraine Province in France where the organization served in three World War I campaigns. In World War II, the unit participated in the Ardennes-Alsace, Rhineland and Central Europe campaigns indicated by the three points, in the color blue for Infantry and for the area of the Rhine River. The white flashes and the red of the scroll allude to the Division shoulder sleeve insignia.
Background: The distinctive unit insignia was originally approved for the 78th Division (Training) on 21 Dec 1971. It was redesignated on 1 Oct 1993 for the 78th Division (Exercise) and the description revised to provide metric measurements. On 17 Oct 1999 the insignia was redesignated for the 78th Division (Training Support).

In popular culture
In the 2019 film, Avengers: Endgame, soldiers of the 78th Inf Div are portrayed at Camp Lehigh, New Jersey. Captain America (Actor Chris Evans) impersonates an Army Officer of the 78th while infiltrating the compound to retrieve one of the Infinity Stones with help from Tony Stark (Robert Downey Jr)

References

The Army Almanac: A Book of Facts Concerning the Army of the United States U.S. Government Printing Office, 1950 reproduced at http://www.history.army.mil/html/forcestruc/cbtchron/cbtchron.html.
Order of Battle: U.S. Army World War II; Edited by Shelby L. Stanton from War Department Archives, 1984. 
United States Army Institute of Heraldry
Lightning, The History of the 78th Infantry Division – 
Lightning: The Story of the 78th Infantry Division
The 78th Division Veterans Assoc. 
Carl Albert Janowski Goes to War and Back (78th Division – World War 1)
My Dad Goes to War

078th Infantry Division, U.S.
Infantry Division, U.S. 078
United States Army divisions of World War I
Military units and formations established in 1917
Training divisions of the United States Army